"My Heroes Have Always Been Cowboys"  was recorded by Waylon Jennings on the 1976 album Wanted! The Outlaws, and further popularized in 1980 by Willie Nelson as a single on the soundtrack to The Electric Horseman. "My Heroes Have Always Been Cowboys" was written by Sharon Vaughn and Nelson's version was his fifth number one on the country chart.  The single stayed at number one for two weeks and spent a total of fourteen weeks on the country chart.

Members of the Western Writers of America chose it as one of the Top 100 Western songs of all time.

Content
The narrator compares his childhood dream of becoming a cowboy to the reality he faces after he realizes the hard truth of cowboy life, finding a strong contrast between the two.

Chart performance

Year-end charts

References

Songs about cowboys and cowgirls
1980 singles
Waylon Jennings songs
Willie Nelson songs
Songs written for films
Songs written by Sharon Vaughn
Columbia Records singles
1976 songs